Blumentritt Road is a major road in Manila, Philippines. It runs through the border of the City of Manila with Quezon City from Rizal Avenue in Santa Cruz district to G. Tuazon Street in Sampaloc district. The road also forms the southern boundary of the Manila North Cemetery. It is named after Bohemian professor and filipinologist, Ferdinand Blumentritt.

The portion of the road from Rizal Avenue to Dimasalang Street in Santa Cruz was originally named Calle Sangleyes (Spanish for "Chinese merchants street") in reference to its original residents. It passes through the Chinese General Hospital and Medical Center and the Manila North Green Park before turning southeast in Sampaloc. The road intersects with Dimasalang Street, A. Bonifacio Avenue, N.S. Amoranto Sr. Avenue, Laon Laan Road, and España Boulevard before terminating at G. Tuazon Street in Sampaloc, near its boundary with San Isidro (Galas), Quezon City. It is served by the Blumentritt LRT station and Blumentritt PNR station at Rizal Avenue.

The section of the road between Rizal Avenue and A. Bonifacio Avenue is a component of National Route 160 (N160), while the section between A. Bonifacio Avenue and España Boulevard is designated as National Route 161 (N161); both routes are of the Philippine highway network. Its remaining section, considered as its extension, up to G. Tuazon Street is unnumbered.

A major flood control project in this road was completed in June 2016.

Landmarks

 Blumentritt Market
 Chinese General Hospital and Medical Center
 Chinese General Hospital College of Nursing and Liberal Arts
 Esteban Abada High School
 Manila North Green Park
 Manuel Quezon High School
 San Roque de Manila Church
 SM Savemore Laon Laan
 Talipapa Market
 Viron Transit

Notes

References

Streets in Manila
Santa Cruz, Manila
Sampaloc, Manila